The Incas were most notable for establishing the Inca Empire in Pre-Columbian America, which was centered in modern day South America in Peru and Chile. It was about 2,500 miles from the northern to southern tip. The Inca Empire lasted from 1438 to 1533. It was the largest Empire in America throughout the Pre-Columbian era. At the peak of the Inca Empire, it was the largest nation in the world and to this day is the largest native state in the western hemisphere. The Inca civilization was located from north to south of the western hemisphere of South America. The Inca state was known as the Kingdom of Cuzco before 1438. Over the course of the Inca Empire, the Inca used conquest and peaceful assimilation to incorporate the territory of modern-day Peru, followed by a large portion of western South America, into their empire, centered on the Andean mountain range. However, shortly after the Inca Civil War, the last Sapa Inca (emperor) of the Inca Empire was captured and killed on the orders of the conquistador Francisco Pizarro, marking the beginning of Spanish rule. The remnants of the empire retreated to the remote jungles of Vilcabamba and established the small Neo-Inca State, which was conquered by the Spanish in 1572.

The Quechua name for the empire after the reforms under Pachacuti was Tawantin Suyu, which can be translated The Four Regions or The Four United Regions. Before the Quechua spelling reform it was written in Spanish as Tahuantinsuyo.  Tawantin is a group of four things (tawa "four" with the suffix -ntin which names a group); suyu means "region" or "province".

The empire was divided into four suyus, whose corners met at the capital, Cuzco (Qosqo).

Timeline

Origin stories of the Incas 

The Inca have four types of origin

In one origin myth, Tici Viracocha of Colina de las Ventanas in Paqariq Tampu sent forth his four sons and four daughters to establish a village. Along the way, Sinchi Roca was born to Manco and Ocllo, and Sinchi Roca is the person who finally led them to the valley of Cuzco where they founded their new village. There, Manco became their leader and became known as Manco Cápac.

In another origin myth, the sun god Inti ordered Manco Cápac and Mama Ocllo to emerge from the depths of Lake Titicaca and found the city of Cuzco. They traveled through caves until reaching Cuzco where they established Hurin Cuzco, or the first dynasty of the Kingdom of Cuzco.

In a third origin myth, an Inca sun god told his wife that he was lonely. She proposed that he create a civilization to worship him and keep him company. He saw this as a wise plan and carried it out. The Inca were born from Lake Cusco and populated the Andes and worshiped their sun god.

In the last origin myth, Manco Cápac, who was the son of the sun, and his sister Mama Occlo, the daughter of the moon, were sent by the sun to look for a place to build an empire. They were to tell when they were at the right place by carrying a special rod with them at all times. Wherever the rod sank into the ground, this was where they were to create a new city. The rod sank into the ground in Cuzco.

The knowledge of these myths is due to oral tradition since the Incas did not have writing. Manco Cápac, who became the leader of his tribe, probably did exist, despite lack of solid evidence. The archeological evidence seems to indicate that the Inca were a relatively unimportant tribe until the time of Sinchi Roca, also called Cinchi Roca, who is the first figure in Inca mythology whose existence can be supported historically.

The Inca people began as a tribe in the Cusco area around the 12th century. Under the leadership of Manco Cápac, they formed the small city-state of Cusco Quechua Qosqo.

In 1438, under the command of Sapa Inca (paramount leader) Pachacuti, whose name meant "world-shaker", they began a far-reaching expansion.  The land Pachacuti conquered was about half the Andes mountain range.

Pachacuti reorganized the kingdom of Cusco into an empire, the Tahuantinsuyu, a federalist system which consisted of a central government with the Inca at its head and four provincial governments with strong leaders. The leaders were Chinchasuyu (NW), Antisuyu (NE), Kuntisuyu (SW), and Qullasuyu (SE). Pachacuti is also thought to have built Machu Picchu, either as a family home or retreat. 

Pachacuti would send spies to regions he wanted in his empire who would report back on their political organization, military might and wealth. He would then send messages to the leaders of these lands extolling the benefits of joining his empire, offering them presents of luxury goods such as high-quality textiles, and promising that they would be materially richer as subject rulers of the Inca. Most accepted the rule of the Inca as a fait accompli and acquiesced peacefully. The ruler's children would then be brought to Cuzco to be taught about Inca administration systems, then return to rule their native lands. This allowed the Inca to indoctrinate the former ruler's children into the Inca nobility, and, with luck, marry their daughters into families at various corners of the empire.

It was traditional for the Inca's son to lead the army; Pachacuti's son Túpac Inca began conquests to the north in 1463 and continued them as Inca after Pachucuti's death in 1471.  His most important conquest was the Kingdom of Chimor, the Inca's only serious rival for the coast of Peru. Túpac Inca's empire stretched north into modern-day Ecuador and Colombia.

Túpac Inca's son Huayna Cápac added significant territory to the south.  At its height, Tahuantinsuyu included Peru, southwest Ecuador, western and south central Bolivia, northwest Argentina, northern Chile and a small part of southwest Colombia.

Tahuantinsuyu was a patchwork of languages, cultures, and peoples. The components of the empire were not all uniformly loyal, nor were the local cultures all fully integrated. The portions of the Chachapoya that had been conquered were almost openly hostile to the Inca, and the Inca nobles rejected an offer of refuge in their kingdom after their troubles with the Spanish. For instance, the Chimú used money in their commerce, while the Inca empire as a whole had an economy based on exchange and taxation of luxury goods and labour (it is said that Inca tax collectors would take the head lice of the lame and old as a symbolic tribute).

Economic productivity was based on collective labor which was organized to benefit the whole community. The ayni was used to help individual members of the community in need, such as a sick member of the community. The Minka or teamwork represented community service and the Mita was the tax paid to the Inca in the form of labor. The Inca did not use currency, economic exchanges were by reciprocity and took place in markets called catus.

Daily life 

A Curaca is in charge or the leader of each group of families also called allyus. Their clothing was made from alpaca fur and even a lot of their religious practices included using the animal as well. For shoes they would wear sandals. At the height of their civilization, there was an estimation of about 20 million Inca peoples. The universal language that was used was Quechua (KECH-WUN). However, there was no form of written language only things like symbols are found. They also mostly lived in a rural setting of villages rather than urban life of living in the cities.

Religion 

The Inca people were very religious. They believed that evil could come about at any time and destroy them. They had sorcerers who were highly trusted and valued to protect from spirits. They also believed in the idea of spirits returning and being reincarnated and would take measures to make sure the next spirit has what it might need. According to the Incas all gods or goddesses come from the all-encompassing Sun God. The king himself is considered the son of the Sun God. The mythology is that the Inca people come from the Sun God so therefore they believe it is their duty to worship said Sun God with celebration.

Government 

We know the names of the kings from the Incan empire because they kept track of them. However, we do not know the dynamics of all the aspects of the kings and their power. The Spanish records that we have do not go into great detail about all that there is to know. The Sapa Inca (absolute ruler) was held in a very high position. They would live a life of luxury. Drinking from gold and silver cups and even luxury furnishing in their palaces. The ruler was mummified after death and would be in ceremonies and even brought out of the Coricancha temple in Cuzco and brought offerings. The social structure of the Incas followed a precise hierarchy as seen in the table below:

Spanish conquest and Neo-Inca State 

Spanish conquistadors led by Francisco Pizarro explored south from Panama, reaching Inca territory by 1526. It was clear that they had reached a wealthy land with prospects of great treasure, and after one more expedition (1529), Pizarro traveled to Spain and received royal approval to conquer the region and be its viceroy.

At the time the Spanish returned to Peru, in 1532, a war of succession between Huayna Capac's sons Huáscar and Atahualpa and unrest among newly conquered territories—and perhaps more they were said to have hidden a city or gold in a vault. Significantly, smallpox, which had spread from Central America—had considerably weakened the empire.

Pizarro did not have a formidable force; with just 170 men, 1 cannon and only 27 horses, he often needed to talk his way out of potential confrontations that could have easily wiped out his party.  Their first engagement was the battle of Puná, near present-day Guayaquil, Ecuador; Pizarro then founded the city of Piura in July 1532. Hernando de Soto was sent inland to explore the interior, and returned with an invitation to meet the Inca, Atahualpa, who had defeated his brother in the civil war and was resting at Cajamarca with his army of 80,000 troops.

Pizarro met with the Inca, who had brought only a small retinue, and through interpreters demanded that he convert to Christianity. A widely disputed legend claims that Atahualpa was handed a Bible and threw it on the floor, the Spanish supposedly interpreted this action as adequate reason for war. Though some chroniclers suggest that Atahualpa simply didn't understand the notion of a book, others portray Atahualpa as being genuinely curious and inquisitive in the situation. Regardless, the Spanish attacked the Inca's retinue (see Battle of Cajamarca), capturing Atahualpa.

Thereby, the victory of the comparatively small Spanish force can be attributed to the presence of Spanish horses, which were unknown to the Inca before the arrival of Pizarro, as well as to the usage of guns and cannons by the Spanish men. Furthermore, the local educational investments, which had an impact on economic growth and development, did not equal those of the Spaniards, with the numeracy level of Peruvian Inca Indios amounting to half the numeracy level of Spanish invaders.

Pizarro used the capture of Atahualpa to gain gold as a ransom. Atahualpa offered the Spaniards enough gold to fill the room he was imprisoned in, and twice that amount of silver. The Incas fulfilled this ransom. Over four months, almost 8 tons of gold was collected. Pizarro was supposed to let the ruler of the Incas free once the ransom was paid, but he refused to release the Inca after that and instead had him strangled in public. During Atahualpa's imprisonment Huáscar was assassinated. The Spanish maintained that this was at Atahualpa's orders; this was one of the charges used against Atahualpa when the Spanish finally decided to put him to death, in August 1533.

The Spanish installed his brother Manco Inca Yupanqui in power; for some time Manco cooperated with the Spanish, while the Spanish fought to put down resistance in the north.  Meanwhile, an associate of Pizarro's, Diego de Almagro, attempted to claim Cusco for himself.  Manco tried to use this intra-Spanish feud to his advantage, recapturing Cusco (1536), but the Spanish retook the city.

Manco Inca then retreated to the mountains of Vilcabamba and founded the Neo-Inca State, where he and his successors ruled for another 36 years, sometimes raiding the Spanish or inciting revolts against them.  In 1572 the last Inca stronghold was discovered, and the last ruler, Túpac Amaru, Manco's son, was captured and executed, bringing the Inca empire to an end.

After the Spanish conquest 
After the fall of Tahuantinsuyu, the new Spanish rulers repressed the people and their traditions. Many aspects of Inca culture were systematically destroyed, including their sophisticated farming system.  The Spanish used the Inca mita (mandatory public service) system to get labourers for mines and plantations.  One member of each family was forced to work in the gold and silver mines, the foremost of which was the silver mine at Potosí.  When one family member died, which would usually happen within a year or two, the family would be required to send a replacement.

The major languages of the empire, Quechua and Aymara, were employed by the Catholic Church to evangelize in the Andean region. In some cases, these languages were taught to peoples who had originally spoken other indigenous languages. Today, Quechua and Aymara remain the most widespread Amerindian languages.

The legend of the Inca has served as inspiration for resistance movements in the region. These include the 1780 rebellion led by Tupac Amaru II against the Spanish, as well as contemporary the guerrilla movements Túpac Amaru Revolutionary Movement (MRTA) and Sendero Luminoso in Peru and Tupamaros in Uruguay.

Notes 
 Before the official orthography, during the use of Hispanic spellings, it was written as tahuantinsuyo. See: Quechuan and Aymaran spelling shift
 Tawantin suyu derives from the Quechua "tawa" (four), to which the suffix "-ntin" (together or united) is added, followed by "suyu" (region or province), which roughly renders as "The land of the four parts together".

References

External links 

 Peru Cultural Society
 E-museum @ Minnesota State University
 Nueva corónica y buen gobierno by Guaman Poma (published 1615)
 Inca Land by Hiram Bingham (published 1912–1922)
 Tupac Amaru, the Life, Times, and Execution of the Last Inca.
 Inca Artifacts, Peru, and Machu Picchu 360-degree movies of inca artifacts and Peruvian landscapes.
 Inca civilization and other ancient civilizations by Genry Joil.
 Ancient Civilizations – Inca

Inca
 
Incas